The 2015 FIBA Americas League was the 8th edition of the top intercontinental professional basketball competition in the Americas. Bauru of Brazil, won its first intercontinental title, after they beat Pioneros de Quintana Roo of Mexico, in the Grand Finals.

Preliminary round

Group A

Group B

Group C

Group D

Quarterfinals

Group E

Group F

Final 4

Semifinals

Third Place Game

Grand Final

Awards
Grand Finals Most Valuable Player
 Alex Garcia – Bauru

External links
FIBA Americas League 
FIBA Americas League 
FIBA Americas  
FIBA Liga Americas Twitter 
LatinBasket.com FIBA Americas League 
Liga de las Américas YouTube Channel 

2014–15
2014–15 in South American basketball
2014–15 in North American basketball